Bandikhedi is a village in the Bhopal district of Madhya Pradesh, India. It is located in the Berasia tehsil.

It is located on the bank of the Parbati River, near Bijawan Kalan, close to the Berasia road.

Demographics 

According to the 2011 census of India, Bandikhedi has 94 households. The effective literacy rate (i.e. the literacy rate of population excluding children aged 6 and below) is 58.41%.

References 

Villages in Berasia tehsil